Andravola Vohipeno is a town and commune in Madagascar. It belongs to the district of Ambatolampy, which is a part of Vakinankaratra region. The population of the commune was estimated to be approximately 5,000 in 2001 commune census.

Only primary schooling is available. The majority 98% of the population of the commune are farmers.  The most important crop is rice, while other important products are fruits, beans, maize and potatoes.  Industry and services provide both employment for 1% of the population.

References and notes 

Populated places in Vakinankaratra